The men's 4 × 100 metres relay event at the 1997 Summer Universiade was held at the Stadio Cibali in Catania, Italy, on 30 and 31 August.

Results

Heats

Final

References

Athletics at the 1997 Summer Universiade
1997